The Servants were an indie band formed in 1985 in Hayes, Middlesex, England by singer-songwriter David Westlake. The band was the original home of Luke Haines.

The band’s Small Time album was well received on its 2012 release, more than twenty years after its 1991-recording. The belated release followed the inclusion of 1990’s Disinterest in Mojo magazine’s 2011 list of the greatest British indie records of all time.

History
Singer-songwriter David Westlake started the band in Hayes, Middlesex with school-friend Ed Moran. The Servants’ first gig was on 1 July 1985, opening for Television Personalities at The Pindar of Wakefield (later The Water Rats) in London's King's Cross.

Westlake’s urbane English songwriting was well received by the press, and first single “She’s Always Hiding” was released on Head Records in March 1986, the band having declined offers from Statik, Stiff, and Él. A Peel session followed.

Keen to distance themselves from the “shambling” scene, The Servants earned a reputation for haughtiness. They grudgingly accepted an invitation by the then-popular NME to appear on their C86 compilation, insisting on the track being the B-side of their first single – the wrong-footing “Transparent”. The NME compilation turned out to sell well and The Servants became known for a lesser track.

Four-song EP The Sun, a Small Star (August ’86) showed Westlake’s songwriting becoming still more deft. Its title-track was later described as “a 24 carat ‘Brown Eyed Girl’ classic”.

Luke Haines was in The Servants from December 1986 to August 1991. Drummer Hugh Whitaker left The Housemartins and joined The Servants in June 1987, as the band returned to the studio to demo new material for Creation Records.

In early 1988, The Servants moved to Glass Records, who invited the band to record an album. Plans were made to go into the studio with John Brand, producer of Hayes punk band the Ruts. At the eleventh hour, the band were told that Glass distributors Red Rhino had “gone bust”. Budget slashed, the band went into the studio to record third single “It’s My Turn”. They played some gigs to support the single but Glass delayed releasing the record for a year.

The Servants released debut album Disinterest in July 1990 on Paperhouse Records. “It is art rock”, Haines later said, “Ten years too late and fifteen years too early.” The line-up for the album featured Alice Readman on bass and Andy Bennett on drums. The record company took The Servants’ fourth and final single, “Look Like A Girl”, from Disinterest.

Westlake and Haines recorded The Servants’ second album, Small Time, in 1991. Not until twenty-one years later – following the inclusion of Disinterest in Mojo magazine’s 2011 list of the greatest British indie records of all time, – was it released, in 2012 on Cherry Red Records. Small Time is Westlake’s own favourite Servants record. The songs are, says Haines, “looser, more mysterious, strange and beautiful, . . . sounding . . . like nothing else really.”

The long unavailability of 1990’s Disinterest is explained in the Small Time notes: it is “stuck in an irretrievable record company quagmire, where it looks set to remain.” Hey Hey We’re the Manqués, a seventeen-track album released at the same time as Small Time, contains demos and rehearsal versions of first-album material.

The Servants’ last gig was at the Rock Garden, 21 August 1991 – “With no room to manoeuvre and no opportunities left”, the band finally called it a day.

Belle & Sebastian frontman Stuart Murdoch told U.S. music magazine The Big Takeover (issue 53, 2004) that he was a huge Westlake fan and that he had tried to locate Westlake in the early ’90s in the hope of forming a band with him, before starting Belle & Sebastian.

Cherry Red Records released a 2006 retrospective of The Servants, called Reserved. The compilation features all of the releases prior to the Disinterest album plus Peel session tracks and demos.

Westlake and Haines played together for the first time in twenty-three years at the Lexington, London N1 on 4 May 2014. Westlake and band played at an NME C86 show on 14 June 2014 in London to coincide with Cherry Red’s expanded reissue of C86.

David Westlake solo
David Westlake recorded a solo album for Creation Records in 1987. Backed by Luke Haines (making his recording debut) and the Triffids’ rhythm section, Westlake cut against the grain of the paisley psychedeliasts then on the Creation roster, Haines later describing it as a minor classic. Westlake and Haines undertook a tour of Britain to promote the record, but Creation failed to release it until six months later. Westlake received good reviews, but otherwise disappeared.

Westlake released self-pressed album Play Dusty for Me (Mahlerphone, 2002) in a limited issue that quickly sold out. Play Dusty for Me was reissued in 2010 and 2015.

Tiny Global Productions released Westlake’s album My Beautiful England in October 2022.

Discography

Albums
 Disinterest (Jul 1990, Paperhouse Records, PAPLP005 [LP]/PAPCD005 [CD])
 Reserved (compilation; Mar 2006, Cherry Red Records, CDMRED297 [CD]; reissued in reduced form as Youth Club Disco, Jul 2011)
 Small Time/Hey Hey We’re the Manqués (Oct 2012, Cherry Red Records, CDB RED 535 [2CD]; reissued Dec 2013)

David Westlake solo
 Westlake (Nov 1987, Creation Records, CRELP019 [LP]; reissued on CD by Sony Music Entertainment in 2004)
 Play Dusty for Me (Jun 2002, Mahlerphone, CDA 001 [CD]; reissued Jul 2010 & Nov 2015)
 My Beautiful England (Oct 2022, Tiny Global Productions, PICI-0038-LP / PICI-0038-CD)

Singles
 “She’s Always Hiding”/“Transparent” (Mar 1986, Head Records, HEAD1 [7"]; reissued Apr 2021)
 “The Sun, a Small Star"/“Meredith”/“It Takes No Gentleman”/“Funny Business” (Oct 1986, Head Records, HEAD3 [12"]; reissued May 2019 [7"])
 “It’s My Turn”/“Afterglow” (Sep 1989, Glass Records, GLASS056 [7"])
 “It’s My Turn”/“Afterglow”/“Faithful to 3 Lovers”/“Do or Be Done” (Sep 1989, Glass Records, GLASS12 056 [12"])
 “Look Like a Girl”/“Bad Habits Die Hard” (August 1990, Paperhouse Records, PAPER004 [7"])

References

External links
 Derek Sozou, David Westlake site
 Luke Haines, Bad Vibes (London: William Heinemann, 2009), 5–10.
 Luke Haines, sleevenotes to the Servants’ compilation Reserved (Cherry Red Records CDMRED 297, 2006)
 Luke Haines, sleevenotes to the Servants’ album Small Time (Cherry Red Records CDB RED 535, 2012)
 John Peel session information
 Servants Retrospective

British indie pop groups
Musical groups established in 1985
Musical groups disestablished in 1991
1985 establishments in England
Cherry Red Records artists
Glass Records artists
Luke Haines